Melpomene was one of the Nine Muses in Greek mythology and a Greek female given name (popular variant: Melpo).

Melpomene may also refer to:
 18 Melpomene, a main belt asteroid
 HMS Melpomene, seven ships of the Royal Navy
 Melpomene (plant), a genus of polypod fern
 Melpomene (spider) a genus of spider in the family Agelenidae
 Melpomene Projects, one of the Housing Projects of New Orleans
 Melpo Mene, an Indie pop band from Stockholm, Sweden
 Melpomene, a woman reported to have attempted to participate in the 1896 Olympics, possibly Stamata Revithi
 Melpomene, album from the band Frailty